Chinavenkannapalem is a village in Kondapi in the Prakasam district, in the Indian state of Andhra Pradesh State. Chinavenkannapalem is a scenic village with an abundance of lush green fields along the Musi River, a tributary of the Krishna river.

Demographics
As per the latest Census of India records, this village has 148 households with a total population of 702.

References

Villages in Prakasam district